Protease-activated receptors (PAR) are a subfamily of related G protein-coupled receptors  that are activated by cleavage of part of their extracellular domain.  They are highly expressed in platelets, and also on endothelial cells, myocytes and neurons.

Protease-activated receptors PAR are not to be mistaken with PAR proteins, a group of regulators of cellular polarity named after their associated partitioning phenotype.

Classification
There are four mammalian members of the protease-activated receptor (PAR) family: PAR1 - encoded by the gene F2R, PAR2 - F2RL1, PAR3 - F2RL2 and PAR4 - F2RL3, all these genes have their locus on chromosome 5 except of PAR4, which is on chromosome 19. They are also members of the seven-transmembrane G-protein-coupled receptor superfamily, and are expressed throughout the body.

History 
PAR1 was firstly described in 1991 on human platelets as a thrombin receptor. In 1994 another member of this family was discovered, S. Nystedt named it simply proteinase activated receptor 2. Experiments on F2R knockout mice then led to the discovery of PAR3 and PAR4.

Activation

Protease activated receptors are integral membrane proteins that are coupled to G-proteins and are activated by specific cleavage of the amino terminal sequence that exposes a new N-terminal sequence functions as a tethered ligand,  which bind a conserved region on extracellular loop 2 (ECL2). Such bound causes the specific change in conformation of the  PAR and alters the affinity for intracellular G-protein. Four types of PAR receptors have been identified by molecular cloning, and classified according to the main enzyme that is able to activate it. It has been determined that a large group of proteases cleave and activate PARs receptors, including various endogenous proteases from: a) the coagulation cascade, b) inflammatory cells, and c) the digestive tract. On the other hand, PARs can be specifically cleaved and irreversibly activated even by exogenous proteases originated from insects, bacteria or plants and fungi. The wide distribution of PARs in a variety of cells supports the idea that they are involved in many process related with the gastrointestinal physiology. Although the proteolysis is the main mechanism for PAR activation, it is well known that a synthetic peptide (SLIGKV) that mimics the new N-terminal sequence produced after the cleavage, activates PAR-2 receptors without its proteolytic processing. In this sense, here we report that TFF3 isolated from human breast milk activates PAR-2 receptors of intestinal epithelial cells HT-29. These findings suggest that TFF3 activates intestinal epithelial cells through G-protein-coupled PAR-2, and could actively participate in the immune system of breastfed babies inducing the production of peptides related to innate defense, such as defensins and cytokines.

PARs are activated by the action of serine proteases such as thrombin (acts on PARs 1, 3 and 4) and trypsin (PAR 2). These enzymes cleave the N-terminus of the receptor, which in turn acts as a tethered ligand. In the cleaved state, part of the receptor itself acts as the agonist, causing a physiological response.

Most of the PAR family act through the actions of G-proteins i (cAMP inhibitory), 12/13 (Rho and Ras activation) and q (calcium signalling) to cause cellular actions.

Function 

The cellular effects of thrombin are mediated by protease-activated receptors (PARs). Thrombin signalling in platelets contributes to hemostasis and thrombosis. Endothelial PARs participate in the regulation of vascular tone and permeability while in vascular smooth muscle they mediate contraction, proliferation, and hypertrophy. In endothelial cells PARs play a key role in promotion vascular barrier function as they provide a positive signals for endothelial adhesion molecules (vascular cell adhesion molecule-1 (VCAM-1), intercellular adhesion molecule-1(ICAM-1), and E-selectin). PARs contribute to the pro-inflammatory response. For example PAR4 induces leukocyte migration and PAR2 helps macrophages to produce cytokines such as interleukin-8 (IL-8). Recent research has also implicated these novel receptors in muscle growth and bone cell differentiation and proliferation.

See also 
 Protease-activated receptor 1
 Protease-activated receptor 2
 Protease-activated receptor 3

References

Further reading

External links 
 
 
 Protease activated receptor peptides

G protein-coupled receptors